Systata silvicola is a species of ulidiid or picture-winged fly in the genus Systata of the family Ulidiidae.

References

Ulidiidae